John Somers-Cocks may refer to:

John Somers-Cocks, 1st Earl Somers
John Somers-Cocks, 2nd Earl Somers

See also
John Somers (disambiguation)
John Cocks (disambiguation)